Myck Lukusa Kabongo (born January 12, 1992) is a Congolese-Canadian professional basketball player. He played two seasons at the Texas Longhorns before going undrafted in the 2013 NBA draft. Afterwards, he started his professional career in the NBA D-League before playing for several European and African teams in the following decade.

In international competition, Kabongo plays for the DR Congo national team, with whom he played at AfroBasket 2017.

High school career
Kabongo started his high school career at Eastern Commerce Collegiate Institute in Toronto. He then played alongside fellow Canadian Tristan Thompson for a season-and-a-half at St. Benedict's Prep before Thompson was removed from the team and transferred to Findlay Prep in Henderson, Nevada. Kabongo stayed at St. Benedict's through his junior season before he transferred to Findlay Prep. Kabongo was the #10 player in the class of 2011 by Scout.com and in the ESPNU 100. Rivals.com rated as the #26 player. He was selected to play in the 2011 McDonald's All-American Game and the 2011 Jordan Brand Classic.

College commitment
Kabongo committed to Texas on January 12, 2009. On October 30, 2010, Kabongo decommitted from Texas, but 5 days later, he recommitted, and signed his letter of intent.

College career
Kabongo started playing for Texas in the 2011–12 season. Kabongo was under investigation for alleged inappropriate contact with Rich Paul, an agent who also handles the contracts of former Findlay Prep and current NBA players Tristan Thompson and Cory Joseph. Initially banned for the entire 2012–13 season, his suspension was later reduced to 23 games, and he made his debut in mid-February and would go on to average 14.6 points per game in eleven games.

In April 2013, he declared for the NBA draft, foregoing his final two years of college eligibility.

Professional career
After going undrafted in the 2013 NBA draft, Kabongo joined the Miami Heat for the 2013 NBA Summer League. On September 30, 2013, he signed with the San Antonio Spurs. However, he was waived by the Spurs on October 15, 2013. On October 31, 2013, he was acquired by the Austin Toros of the NBA Development League.

On October 30, 2014, Kabongo was acquired by the Austin Spurs. On November 1, 2014, he was traded to the Fort Wayne Mad Ants. On December 29, 2014, he was waived by the Mad Ants after appearing in 16 games while averaging 8.8 points, 4.1 rebounds and 3.3 assists per game. On January 9, 2015, he was acquired by the Texas Legends. Five days later, he was waived by the Legends after appearing in just two games.

On October 31, 2015, Kabongo was selected by the Delaware 87ers in the second round of the 2015 NBA Development League Draft, only to be traded to the Erie BayHawks on draft night.

On August 27, 2016, Kabongo signed with BCM U Pitești of the Romanian Liga Națională.

On January 4, 2018, Kabongo signed with Zornotza Saskibaloi Taldea of the Spanish Liga EBA.

On February 23, 2018, Kabongo signed with STB Le Havre of the French LNB Pro B. Kabono joined the Guelph Nighthawks of the Canadian Elite Basketball League in 2019, but was waived on July 22. Kabongo joined the Svendborg Rabbits in 2019. He averaged 12.4 points, 3.8 rebounds, 2.8 assists, and 1.6 steals per game. On September 10, 2020, Kabongo signed with Akademija FMP in the Macedonian First League.

On May 1, 2021, Kabongo signed with Mozambican club Ferroviário de Maputo to play in the Basketball Africa League (BAL). He was a key part of Ferroviário's run to the quarterfinals in the first BAL season.

Starting from November 2021, Kabongo played for Al-Rayyan in the Qatari Basketball League. On December 5, he scored 42 points and had 11 assists in a 111–91 win over rival Al Ahli.

On December 7, 2021, Kabongo joined South African champions Cape Town Tigers to play for the team in the 2022 BAL qualification games.

National team
Kabongo represented the DR Congo national basketball team at the AfroBasket 2017 in Senegal/Tunisia where he finished among the top players in the categories assists per game (4.8) and steals per game (2.8).

Kabongo was invited to camp with Canada's national team for the 2013 FIBA Americas Championship but failed to make the final roster.

Amateur career
Kabongo competes for Overseas Elite in annual The Basketball Tournament. He was a point guard on the 2015 team who won TBT's $1 million prize.

Personal life 
His brother is Canadian actor Emmanuel Kabongo.

Awards and honors
2011 McDonald's All-American team selection
2011 Jordan Brand High School All-American team selection
2012 Big 12 All-Rookie team selection
2021 BAL assists leader

BAL career statistics

|-
| style="text-align:left;"|2021
| style="text-align:left;"| Ferroviário 
| 4 || 4 || 34.2 || .236 || .208 || .826 || 5.0 || style="background:#cfecec;"| 6.8* || 2.3 || .0 || 12.5
|-
| style="text-align:left;"|2022
| style="text-align:left;"|Cape Town
| 6 || 6 || 31.2 || .278 || .125 || .625 || 5.3 || 6.7 || 2.3 || .0 || 8.8
|-

References

External links
 Texas Longhorns bio
 DraftExpress.com profile
 NBADraft.net profile

1992 births
Living people
Austin Toros players
Black Canadian basketball players
Cape Town Tigers players
Canadian expatriate basketball people in the United States
Canadian expatriate basketball people in France
Canadian expatriate basketball people in Mexico
Canadian expatriate sportspeople in Denmark
Canadian men's basketball players
Canadian people of Democratic Republic of the Congo descent
Democratic Republic of the Congo emigrants to Canada
Democratic Republic of the Congo expatriate sportspeople in South Africa
Democratic Republic of the Congo men's basketball players
Ferroviário de Maputo (basketball) players
Erie BayHawks (2008–2017) players
Findlay Prep alumni
Fort Wayne Mad Ants players
McDonald's High School All-Americans
Parade High School All-Americans (boys' basketball)
People from Lubumbashi
Point guards
Raptors 905 players
Rayos de Hermosillo players
Basketball players from Toronto
Svendborg Rabbits players
Texas Legends players
Guelph Nighthawks players
Texas Longhorns men's basketball players